Harry Benjamin Jepson (August 16, 1870 in New Haven, CT – August 23, 1952 in Noank, CT) was an American organist and composer and (starting in 1906) the first University Organist of Yale.

Jepson studied at Yale under Horatio Parker and Gustave Stoeckel, earning a B.A. in 1893 and a B.M. in 1894. He then studied in Paris under Charles Marie Widor and Louis Vierne. He was appointed instructor at Yale in 1895, eventually rising to a full professorship in 1907. He also directed the Battell Chapel choir. He retired in 1939; Charles Kullman was among the performers at the musical service in held for his retirement.

Among his students were Edward Shippen Barnes, Seth Bingham, and Edwin Arthur Kraft.

Yale's Harry B. Jepson Memorial Scholarship is named after him, and he oversaw the design and construction of the renowned Newberry Memorial Organ in Yale's Woolsey Hall.

Selected works 

 Ballade for organ (c. 1907), dedicated to Florence Annette Wells, New Haven area organist and 1900 Yale graduate.
 Veni, Sancte Spiritus, anthem for chorus and organ.

References

External links 
 

American classical organists
American male organists
1870 births
1952 deaths
Yale University alumni
Yale University faculty
Male classical organists